The typical honeycreepers form a genus Cyanerpes of small birds in the tanager family Thraupidae. They are found in the tropical New World from Mexico south to Brazil. They occur in the forest canopy, and, as the name implies, they are specialist nectar feeders with long curved bills.

The four Cyanerpes species have colourful legs, long wings and a short tail. The males are typically glossy purple-blue and the females greenish.

Taxonomy and species list
The genus Cyanerpes was introduced in 1899 by the American ornithologist Harry C. Oberholser with the red-legged honeycreeper as the type species. The name combines the Ancient Greek kuanos meaning "dark-blue" and herpēs meaning "creeper".

There are two other tanagers with honeycreeper in their common name: the green honeycreeper in the monospecific genus Chlorophanes and the golden-collared honeycreeper in the monospecific genus Iridophanes. These two species are sister taxa and belong to the subfamily Hemithraupinae rather than to Dacninae with the members of Cyanerpes.

The genus contains four species:

Eggs
A commonly repeated, yet false, belief about the various honeycreeper species is that some of them lay black eggs.  This idea was first made known in the scientific community with the 1899 publication of Nehrkorn's egg catalog; Nehrkorn's claim was cited in ornithological literature for many years without verification, but by the 1940s it was established that none of the members of Cyanerpes lay such eggs.

References

External links

Honeycreeper videos, photos and sounds on the Internet Bird Collection

 
Taxa named by Harry C. Oberholser